Rostrevor is a village and townland in County Down, Northern Ireland. It lies at the foot of Slieve Martin on the coast of Carlingford Lough, near Warrenpoint. The Kilbroney River flows through the village and Rostrevor Forest is nearby. It is within Newry, Mourne and Down District.

Rostrevor had a population of 2,800 in the 2011 Census.

Name
The first part of the name "Rostrevor" comes from the Irish word ros, meaning a wood or wooded headland. The second part of the name comes from Sir Edward Trevor from Denbighshire in Wales, who settled in the area in the early 17th century and was succeeded by his son Marcus Trevor, who later became Viscount Dungannon. Walter Harris, writing in 1744, mistakenly believed that the first part of the name came from Sir Edward Trevor's wife Rose, a daughter of Henry Ussher, Archbishop of Armagh. His etymology was later repeated by some other writers. Before Sir Edward Trevor's renaming of the area it was known as Caisleán Ruaidhrí, anglicised "Castle Rory" or "Castle Roe", after one of the Magennis lords of Iveagh.

Today the spelling Rostrevor is used for the village, while the spelling Rosstrevor is used for the townland.

Places of interest
Nearby Cloughmore is a 50-ton granite boulder perched on the slopes of Slieve Martin, 1,000 ft above the village of Rostrevor, and known locally as 'the big stone'. It was deposited there by retreating glaciers during the Last Glacial Maximum. Local legend states that the stone was thrown by Irish mythological hero and frequent giant Finn McCool from the Cooley Mountains, on the other side of Carlingford Lough, to settle a fight with a local frost-giant named Ruiscairre, burying him underneath the boulder. Walking around the stone seven times will allegedly bring good luck.

The old church, supposedly built on an original site established by St Brónach, stands in the graveyard on the Kilbroney road. It became a listed building in 1983.

In the village's Catholic church is the bell of Brónach, dating from around 900 A.D. There are many stories of how the bell used to scare locals walking past St Bronach's church on stormy nights. All they could hear was a mighty sound and did not know the source; many believed it to be a calling from God. It was said that the ringing of the bell warned of rough water on the lough. In 1885, the bell was found in the fork of an old oak tree, where it had been hidden many years before, probably at the time of the Reformation.

The village has two rivers, the Ghan and the Fairy Glen, so named because many fairies are suspected of living along the banks of the river.

People

Rostrevor is believed to be the birthplace of Somerled, founder of Clan Donald and Lord of Argyll, Kintyre and Lorne, in the mid 12th century.
Rostrevor was the birthplace of Major General Robert Ross-of-Bladensburg, a British commander during the War of 1812. Ross's Monument stands above the Warrenpoint Road on the edge of the village. It is a tall granite obelisk erected to his memory in 1826.  The Ross Family lived at Kilbroney Park.
Rostrevor is the birthplace of Ben Dunne, founder of the chain store Dunnes Stores.
Sir Francis Stronge lived in Kilbroney House.
Former Irish President Mary McAleese and her family lived in Rostrevor village centre before she was elected to office in 1997.
Irish Folk group The Sands Family live in Rostrevor.
 Another resident of Rostrevor for a time was Eurovision winner, Dana.
T. K. Whitaker, economist and a pivotal figure in the development of the Republic of Ireland, was born in Rostrevor to a father from County Westmeath and a mother from County Clare. The family later moved to Drogheda.
Catherine McGrath, country singer, is from the village.
Cathal McCabe, poet, who grew up in nearby Warrenpoint, has lived in and near Rostrevor since 2004.
Laurence McGivern, Irish Paralympic swimmer and World Bronze Medalist (Canada 2013) was also born in Rostrevor.

Education
Kilbroney Integrated Primary School
Killowen Primary School
St. Bronagh's Primary School
Ywam Rostrevor

Horse Tram
Rostrevor Tram station opened on 1 August 1877 with a horse-drawn tram service to Warrenpoint. It closed in February 1915.

Demography
On Census Day (27 March 2011) the usually resident population of Rostrevor Settlement was 2,800, accounting for 0.15% of the NI total. Of these:
 21.14% were under 16 years old and 14.57% were aged 65 and above;
 48.68% of the population were male and 51.32% were female; and
 88.96% were from a Catholic community background and 7.75% were from a 'Protestant and Other Christian (including Christian related)' community background.

Sport
The local Gaelic Athletic Association (GAA) club is St Bronagh's. The local association football club is Rossowen F.C.

See also
List of villages in Northern Ireland
List of towns in Northern Ireland
Rostrevor College, a large school in Adelaide, Australia, named after 'Rostrevor House', the main historic mansion residence constructed on the site in 1878 which itself was named after Rostrevor, Northern Ireland.

References

External links

Villages in County Down
Townlands of County Down
Seaside resorts in Northern Ireland
Civil parish of Kilbroney, County Down